Esport3 is a TV channel of Televisió de Catalunya dedicated to sports programming.

Overview 
Sports programming includes transmissions and sporting events, especially during prime-time on Mondays to Fridays and all weekend. The channel completes its commitment to programs that focus on the lifestyle sports, promoting emerging talents such as being in shape, health, adventure, the outdoors and extreme sports. Every Monday to Thursday nights, a sports talk-show  is being broadcast and it is hosted by Lluís Canut. Since 2021 Esport3 is broadcasting American football games of the Barcelona Dragons (ELF) in the European League of Football in Catalan language.

Other important shows are Tot L'esport, Temps d'aventura, NBA.cat, Futbol Cat and Gol a Gol.

See also
Televisió de Catalunya
TV3

References

External links
Official Site 

Televisió de Catalunya
Catalan-language television stations
Television stations in Catalonia
Television channels and stations established in 2011
Sports television in Spain